San Romano is a deconsecrated Roman Catholic Church located on Piazza San Romano in the center of Lucca, region of Tuscany, Italy. It stands adjacent to the Ducal Palace of Lucca.

The church was erected by the Dominican order in the second half of the 13th century with bricks from the razed Augusta fortress. Inside is the tomb of San Romano, built in 1490 by Matteo Civitali. The church once held altarpieces by Fra Bartolomeo. The elegantly decorated interior nave is presently used as an auditorium.

References

Roman Catholic churches in Lucca
13th-century Roman Catholic church buildings in Italy
Former churches in Italy